Chrząstówek  is a village in the administrative district of Gmina Łęczyca, within Łęczyca County, Łódź Voivodeship, in central Poland. Chrząstówek is the largest producer of barley in the county.

References

Villages in Łęczyca County